Big Rapids Public Schools is a Class B district in mid-Michigan.  The District's Superintendent is Tim Haist.  The district operates Big Rapids High School (A Michigan Blue Ribbon School), an alternative high school, Big Rapids Middle School (grades 5-8), two elementary schools (Grades K-4) an early childhood development center, and a preschool for 4 year olds who qualify and others if space allows.

On May 11, 2006, Big Rapids High School was recognized by the Michigan Department of Education as a Blue Ribbon Exemplary School.

Schools

High school (9-12) 

 Big Rapids High School

Middle school (5-8) 

 Big Rapids Middle School

Elementary schools (PreK-4) 

 Brookside Elementary School
 Riverview Elementary School

Closed elementary schools 

 Eastwood Elementary School
 Hillcrest Elementary School

Sports 

Big Rapids is in the Central State Athletics Association (CSAA). The CSAA includes; Big Rapids, Reed City, Chippewa Hills, Morley Stanwood, Lakeview, Central Montcalm, and newly added members as of 2008; Holton, Hesperia and White Cloud.

The Big Rapids boys basketball team recorded their first ever undefeated season in the 2008-2009 School year with a record of 20-0. The Cardinals suffered a tough loss to Whitehall in the first round of District play after beating them [Whitehall] in the regular season.

The boys soccer team leads the CSAA in Conference Titles with back to back (6-0) records in conference play in 2006 and 2007. In 2007 they also won the District Title before losing to Manistee in Regional play. The only CSAA members with Soccer teams are Big Rapids, Reed City, Chippewa Hills, Lakeview, and Holton.

Cardinal Golf went all the way to the top in the 2007-2008 school year, taking their first State Championship.

Big Rapids High School also possesses a strong Hockey Program with many Final Four appearances, and two bids for the State Title, one in 1999 and one in the 2008-2009 school year. Big Rapids also celebrated 25 years of Cardinal Hockey as of 2009.

Arts 

Big Rapids has an award winning arts program. The high school choirs are frequent State goers and highly decorated Solo and Ensemblists. The visual arts program, formerly taught by world-renowned medalist James Malone-Beach, has won several awards. The band and marching band programs, led by Brian Balch, have an excellent record as well at state festivals.

References

External links
BRPS Site

School districts in Michigan
Education in Mecosta County, Michigan